Heinrich Köberle, born in 1946, is a German athlete. He competes in wheelchair marathons in a handcycle, and has won four gold medals in marathons at the Paralympic Games - more than any other athlete. He holds the record for the fastest men's marathon in his disability category (the most severe for wheelchair athletes), set in Berlin in 1995, in 2:23:08.

Biography
Köberle first participated in the Paralympic Games when the marathon was introduced in 1984. He competed in category 1A (wheelchair marathon for athletes with the most severe level of disability). Only three athletes began the race, and only Köberle reached the finish line, obtaining his first Paralympic gold medal with a time of 3:41:47. He defended his title in 1988, in a more competitive event, in which all four starters reached the finish line. Köberle came first, drastically improving his previous performance, completing the marathon in 2:50:39 - almost seven minutes ahead of second-placed Rainer Kueschall (of Switzerland). In 1992, the number of competitors increased to ten. Köberle won in 2:32:56, this time only twenty-four seconds ahead of Kueschall - but setting a Paralympic record which still stands. In 1996, he won gold for the fourth consecutive time, in 2:49:11. The slower time was sufficient for gold, as four of his six opponents failed to complete the race. Those four gold medals established a record which remains unbeaten in the Paralympic marathon, in any disability category. In 2000, he competed for the fifth and final time, and completed the race in 2:48:45, well short of his personal best achieved five years earlier. His performance was sufficient for a silver medal ; Alvise de Vidi of Italy won gold, just over a minute ahead of him.

Though he no longer competes at the Paralympic Games, Köberle still takes part in marathons as of 2010.

See also
 Marathon at the Paralympics
 Germany at the Paralympics

References 

Paralympic athletes of Germany
Athletes (track and field) at the 1984 Summer Paralympics
Athletes (track and field) at the 1988 Summer Paralympics
Athletes (track and field) at the 1992 Summer Paralympics
Athletes (track and field) at the 1996 Summer Paralympics
Athletes (track and field) at the 2000 Summer Paralympics
Paralympic gold medalists for Germany
Paralympic silver medalists for Germany
1946 births
Living people
World record holders in Paralympic athletics
Medalists at the 1984 Summer Paralympics
Medalists at the 1988 Summer Paralympics
Medalists at the 1992 Summer Paralympics
Medalists at the 1996 Summer Paralympics
Medalists at the 2000 Summer Paralympics
Paralympic medalists in athletics (track and field)
German male wheelchair racers
20th-century German people